Sirkka Sokka-Matikainen is a retired Finnish athlete who competes in compound archery. Her achievements include a bronze medal at the 2001 World Archery Championships, a team silver medal at the 2002 European Archery Championships and becoming the world number one ranked archer in September 2002.

References

Living people
Finnish female archers
World Archery Championships medalists
Year of birth missing (living people)